The 2015–16 Telekom S-League was the 12th season of the Telekom S-League in the Solomon Islands. The winner will qualify for the 2015–16 OFC Champions League. All matches are to be played at the hillside ground, Lawson Tama Stadium, with an approximate capacity of 20,000.

Teams
 FC Guadalcanal (Guadalcanal)
 Koloale (Honiara)
 KOSSA (Honiara)
 Malaita Kingz (Malaita)
 Marist Fire (Honiara)
 Real Kakamora (Makira-Ulawa)
 Solomon Warriors (Honiara)
 West Honiara (Honiara)
 Western United (Western)

Standings

Regular season

Round 1

Round 2

Round 3

Round 4

Round 5

Round 6

Round 7

Round 8

Round 9

Round 10

Round 11

Round 12

Round 13

Round 14

Round 15

Round 16

Round 17

References

Solomon Islands S-League seasons
Solomon
Solomon
football
football